Christos Peppas (born 1899, date of death unknown) was a Greek football player. He was born in Piraeus. He played for the club Piraikos Enosi. He was member of the Greek team for the 1920 Olympic Games in Antwerp.

References

External links

1899 births
Year of death unknown
Greek footballers
Footballers at the 1920 Summer Olympics
Olympic footballers of Greece
Association football midfielders
Footballers from Piraeus

Ethnikos Piraeus F.C. players